Odsmal may refer to:
 Óðsmál research project by Guðrún Kristín Magnúsdóttir
 Ödsmål locality in Sweden